Basketweave is a structure that exists in many textile arts. It consists of multiple horizontal strands and vertical strands, resulting in a square pattern associated with woven baskets.

It is used in the following textile arts:
 Basket weaving
 Basketweave in weaving
 Basketweave in knitting
 Basketweave in knot making
 Basketweave as a variant of tent stitch in needlepoint
 Basketweave in crochet

See also
 Plain weave
 Seed/Moss stitch
 Monk's cloth

Textile arts
Crafts